Voorhies is an unincorporated community in Lincoln Township, Black Hawk County, Iowa, United States.

Voorhies is located in the most southwestern portion of Black Hawk County at  approximately 6 miles southwest of Hudson and 7 miles east of Reinbeck.

History
Voorhies was platted on June 17, 1900, shortly after the Chicago and Northwestern Railway reached its location.

There are two businesses currently in Voorhies - a grain elevator, the Voorhies Grain Company and Raincap Industries.  However, in 1904 in addition to the Northern Grain Company Voohries had a cooperative telephone association and creamery.

In 1924, Voorhies' population was 45.

References

External links 
 Black Hawk County government

Unincorporated communities in Black Hawk County, Iowa
Waterloo – Cedar Falls metropolitan area
Unincorporated communities in Iowa
1900 establishments in Iowa